Aleksandr Beldinov (Russian: Александр Бельдинов), born 31 October 1981, is a retired Kyrgyzstani footballer who was a midfield, and a football manager. He is known as former player and manager of Alga Bishkek. He was a member of the Kyrgyzstan national football team, and played four matches in the period 2003–2004.

Career statistics

International

References

External links
ffkr.kg ffkr.kg

1981 births
Living people
Kyrgyzstani footballers
Kyrgyzstani people of Russian descent
Association football midfielders
Kyrgyzstan international footballers